Rikki Neave was a six-year-old boy who was murdered on 28 November 1994 by a 13-year-old boy, James Watson, in Peterborough, England. In 1996, his abusive mother, Ruth Neave, was tried and acquitted of his murder. Watson was convicted of the murder in 2022 after new DNA evidence was found.

Murder
Rikki Neave was born on 4 March 1988 and lived on the Welland Estate in Peterborough, Cambridgeshire, England. On 28 November 1994, he was strangled by a 13-year-old boy, James Watson. His naked corpse was found in woods next to the A15 road the following day.

Investigation

Ruth Neave 
At the time of the murder, Rikki's mother Ruth was the only adult living in the family house. She was hated by her neighbours due to her drug addiction and poor parenting, including physical abuse, which attracted visits by the police and social services during the early 1990s. Many neighbours believed she had killed her son, and the police treated her as the prime suspect. In 1996, she was tried and acquitted of the murder. Before the trial, she had pleaded guilty to child cruelty offences, for which she was sentenced to seven years' imprisonment.

James Watson  
Watson was arrested for the murder in April 2016. Watson was born on 1 April 1981 and was also from the Welland Estate. At the time of the murder he was 13 and lived in Woodgate children's home. Watson had convictions for various offences, and when he was 11 he sexually assaulted a five-year-old boy. Watson was briefly spoken to by police in late 1994. Despite being aware of his homosexuality, when Watson was 15, he had a relationship with a girl who lived at Woodgate and they had a son.

After his arrest, Watson fled to Portugal and was extradited back to the UK. He was tried for murder at London's Old Bailey from 18 January to 21 April 2022. Amongst other evidence against him was new DNA findings which revealed his DNA was on Rikki's clothing. Watson was convicted of the murder and on 24 June he was sentenced to life by judge Mrs Justice McGowan, with a minimum of 15 years.

See also
HM Prison Durham – where Ruth Neave was held alongside Myra Hindley and Rose West during her sentence for child abuse
Murder of Brian McDermott – similar UK child murder case in which an individual who was only 16 at the time is the prime suspect
Michael Weir case – a prior notable case presided over by Justice McGowan

Other UK cold cases in which the DNA of the perpetrator is now known:
Murder of Deborah Linsley
Murders of Eve Stratford and Lynne Weedon
Murders of Jacqueline Ansell-Lamb and Barbara Mayo
Murder of Lindsay Rimer
Murder of Lyn Bryant
Murder of Janet Brown
Murder of Linda Cook 
Murder of Melanie Hall
Batman rapist, subject to Britain's longest-running serial rape investigation

References

1990s missing person cases
1990s trials
1994 murders in the United Kingdom
2020s trials
20th century in Cambridgeshire
History of Peterborough
Missing person cases in England
Murder trials
November 1994 crimes
November 1994 events in the United Kingdom
Old Bailey
Trials in London